Sigma Derby is an electro-mechanical horse race used for gambling manufactured by Japanese manufacturer Sigma Game Inc. and introduced in 1985.  Up to ten players can buy in with quarters and place bets on the five horses; a  quinella of two horses in any order pays out according to the odds.  The house has roughly a 10-20% advantage, depending on the machine.

After the closing of the New Frontier Hotel and Casino, there is only one remaining Sigma Derby machine in Las Vegas. It is located at The D Las Vegas in Downtown Las Vegas.

Atlantic City is home of one Sigma Derby type machine in the Tropicana hotel and casino, known as Royal Derby.

Two new versions of a racing game similar to Sigma Derby made their debut at the G2E Conference in Las Vegas, NV in 2015.  One was a prototype game called "Classic Derby," made by manufacturing company VSR Industries. Another was a game called Royal Derby, made by Slovenian gaming company Alfastreet.

References

Gambling games
Horse racing
1985 introductions